Ryan Madar (born April 3, 1986) is a retired American professional wrestler known better by his ring name, "Steel City Prodigy" Ryan Mitchell. He was based out of the Pittsburgh-area, specifically competing in NWA East, though he had also wrestled for the Funking Conservatory and All Japan Pro Wrestling. He was briefly signed to Florida Championship Wrestling, a developmental territory of World Wrestling Entertainment, until a contract dispute between Mitchell and Marti Funk resulted in his release in August 2008. He appears in the 2013 film "Pro Wrestlers vs Zombies" starring Roddy Piper, Matt Hardy, and Kurt Angle. Citing Shawn Michaels as his boyhood idol and hero, Madar dedicated his professional wrestling career to Michaels, often emulating his gear and in-ring tactics.

Career

Funking Conservatory
Born in Smithton, Pennsylvania, Ryan Madar completed high school and enrolled as a midshipman in the Naval Reserve Officer Training Corps at Jacksonville University.  However, Mitchell opted not to accept a commission in the US Navy, deciding instead to pursue a career in professional wrestling. Mitchell debuted in 2004 for Coastal Championship Wrestling in Yulee, Florida and wrestled for them mainly until starting to wrestle for Dory Funk, Jr.'s "Funkin' Conservatory". Within a year, he had held all four of its championship titles including the promotion's heavyweight title. He wrestled there, briefly appearing for All Japan Pro Wrestling, until being scouted by Rocky Johnson.  Rocky would take Mitchell on to sign a deal with World Wrestling Entertainment where he would wrestle for their developmental league Florida Championship Wrestling.  A contract issue would have Mitchell's WWE deal recalled soon after.  Mitchell then moved on the wrestle mainly for NWA East / Pro Wrestling eXpress, and other northern independent promotions.

All-Japan Pro Wrestling
Mitchell made his debut for the Tokyo-based All Japan Pro Wrestling in January 2008 at Korakuen Hall, where he cut a promo in English thanking AJPW president Keiji Mutoh for signing him for the tour.  Mitchell would go on to team with Dory Funk, Jr., Osamu Nishimura, and others while facing Japanese talents such as Kensuke Sasaki, Katsuhiko Nakajima, and Mutoh. He later escorted Dory Funk, Jr. to the ring during his retirement match at Ryōgoku Kokugikan against Masanobu Fuchi & Genichiro Tenryu on March 1, 2008. Mitchell left Japan after the 2008 Excite Series.

Florida Championship Wrestling
Mitchell faced Afa Anoaʻi, Jr. in Florida Championship Wrestling, who would later become known as Manu on the WWE Raw brand. During this time, Mitchell appeared numerous times as a television extra for World Wrestling Entertainment on all three of their televised shows. His time in FCW was very brief, however, as the contract dispute between Mitchell and Marti Funk resulted in his contract being cancelled by WWE on July 30, 2008.

NWA East
Mitchell has since been a mainstay on the US northern indy scene.  On September 26, 2009, Mitchell wrestled NWA National Heavyweight Champion Phill Shatter at NWA East's 15th Anniversary Show, in a losing effort. However, he would go on to defeat Dash Bennett for the NWA East Three Rivers Championship in McKeesport, Pennsylvania on January 30, 2010. He followed this up three days later at RWA Uprising II with a victory over Sterling James Keenan in a 30-minute Iron Man match to win the RWA Heavyweight Championship.

World Wrestling Entertainment (WWE)
Mitchell recently wrestled on an episode of WWE Superstars in a losing effort against Vladimir Kozlov on May 13, 2010. This match was filmed during a WWE Raw (May 10, 2010) in Pittsburgh, Pennsylvania,  the last WWE event at the Mellon Arena, known to the locals as the Igloo. This made Ryan Mitchell the last Pittsburgh-born professional wrestler to perform at the Igloo.  Mitchell would also wrestle Dos Caras Jr. the next night in a dark match at the WWE SmackDown tapings from the HSBC Arena in Buffalo, New York.

Retirement and U.S. Army

Mitchell would wrestle his last match for the Renegade Wrestling Alliance in West Newton, PA in a handicap tag match pitting himself, Chris Taylor, and Ryan's father Dean Madar against Cueball Carmichael and Ryan Edmonds with Ashton Amherst serving as special referee.  Mitchell would later comment that having his mentor, three best friends, and father all working his last match was a "helluva way to go out!"

Mitchell is currently a Warrant Officer in the United States Army where he serves as a UH-60 Blackhawk Pilot, and has deployed to combat in Afghanistan.

Championships and accomplishments
Black Diamond Wrestling
BDW Tag Team Championship (1 time) - with Jason Cage

Funkin' Conservatory
FC World Heavyweight Champion (1 time)
FC International Heavyweight Champion (1 time)
FC Florida Heavyweight Championship (1 time)
FC Tag Team Championship (2 times) - with Elvis Sharp

NWA East / Pro Wrestling eXpress
NWA East Heavyweight Championship (1 time)
NWA East Three Rivers Championship (1 time)
NWA APWF Throwback Champion (won August 2010, now defunct)
NWA East Sean Evans Tournament Winner (2009)
NWA East Golden Ticket Battle Royal Winner (2010)

Renegade Wrestling Alliance
RWA Heavyweight Championship (1 time)

Other titles
St. Jude's Hospital Heavyweight Championship (1 time, current)

References

External links
Ryan Mitchell at Cagematch.de

1986 births
Living people
People from Westmoreland County, Pennsylvania
Jacksonville University alumni
Professional wrestlers from Pennsylvania